This article provides information on candidates who stood for the 1949 Australian federal election. The election was held on 10 December 1949.

Both the House of Representatives and the Senate were expanded at this election. All seats are designated as held by the party that held the notional majority after the redistribution.

By-elections, appointments and defections

Defections
In 1949, Labor MP Max Falstein (Watson) lost endorsement for the election. He was expelled from the Labor Party and sat as an Independent.
At the previous election, Charles Davidson had been jointly endorsed by the Liberal and Country parties to contest the seat of Capricornia, and had caucused with the Liberals in parliament. In 1949, he was endorsed instead by the Country Party to contest the new seat of Dawson, and subsequently sat as a Country Party member.

Redistributions and seat changes
Due to the expansion of the House, redistributions of electoral boundaries occurred in all states.
In New South Wales, nineteen new seats were created: the notionally Labor seats of Banks, Cunningham, Evans, Grayndler, Kingsford-Smith, Lawson, Lowe, Mitchell, Paterson, Phillip, Shortland and St George; the notionally Liberal seats of Bennelong, Bradfield, Macarthur and Mackellar; the notionally Country seats of Farrer and Lyne; and the notionally Lang Labor seat of Blaxland. The Liberal-held seat of North Sydney and the Lang Labor-held seat of Reid became notionally Labor.
The member for Martin, Fred Daly (Labor), contested Grayndler.
The member for North Sydney, Billy Hughes (Liberal), contested Bradfield.
The member for Reid, Jack Lang (Lang Labor), contested Blaxland.
The member for West Sydney, William O'Connor (Labor), contested Martin.
In Victoria, the Independent-held seat Bourke was renamed Burke, and became notionally Labor. Thirteen new seats were created: the notionally Labor seats of Darebin, Gellibrand, Hoddle, Lalor and Wills; the notionally Liberal seats of Chisholm, Higgins, Higinbotham, Isaacs and La Trobe; and the notionally Country seats of Mallee, McMillan and Murray. The Liberal-held seat of Fawkner and the Country-held seat of Bendigo became notionally Labor.
The member for Ballaarat, Reg Pollard (Labor), contested Lalor.
The member for Bendigo, George Rankin (Country), contested the Senate.
The member for Bourke, Doris Blackburn (Independent Labor), contested Wills.
The member for Fawkner, Harold Holt (Liberal), contested Higgins.
The member for Indi, John McEwen (Country, contested Murray.
The member for Wimmera, Winton Turnbull (Country), contested Mallee.
In Queensland, eight new seats were created: the notionally Labor seats of Bowman, Dawson and Leichhardt; the notionally Liberal seats of McPherson, Oxley, Petrie and Ryan; and the notionally Country seat of Fisher. The Labor-held seats of Griffith and Lilley became notionally Liberal.
The member for Capricornia, Charles Davidson (Country), contested Dawson.
The member for Darling Downs, Arthur Fadden (Country), contested McPherson, as part of a Coalition agreement that allocated Darling Downs to the Liberal Party.
The member for Maranoa, Charles Adermann (Country), contested Fisher.
In Western Australia, three new seats were created: the notionally Labor seat of Curtin; and the notionally Country seats of Canning and Moore. The Country-held seat of Swan became notionally Labor.
The member for Swan, Len Hamilton (Country), contested Canning.
In South Australia, four new seats were created: the notionally Labor seats of Kingston, Port Adelaide and Sturt; and the notionally Liberal seat of Angas. The Labor-held seat of Boothby became notionally Liberal.
The member for Boothby, Thomas Sheehy (Labor), contested Kingston.
The member for Hindmarsh, Albert Thompson (Labor), contested Port Adelaide.
There were minimal changes in Tasmania.
A new seat was created for the Australian Capital Territory.

Retiring Members and Senators

Labor
 Frank Brennan (Batman, Vic)
 Frank Gaha MP (Denison, Tas)
 James Scullin MP (Yarra, Vic)
Senator Joe Collings (Qld)

Liberal
 William Hutchinson MP (Deakin, Vic)

Country
 Joe Abbott MP (New England, NSW)

House of Representatives
Sitting members at the time of the election are shown in bold text. Successful candidates are highlighted in the relevant colour. Where there is possible confusion, an asterisk (*) is also used.

Australian Capital Territory

New South Wales

Northern Territory

Queensland

South Australia

Tasmania

Victoria

Western Australia

Senate
Sitting Senators are shown in bold text. The Senate was expanded at this election, with each state now allocated ten senators instead of six. Each state elected seven senators, two of whom were elected to short-term vacancies. This was also the first occasion where the Senate was elected using proportional representation. Tickets that elected at least one Senator are highlighted in the relevant colour. Successful candidates are identified by an asterisk (*).

New South Wales
Seven seats were up for election. The Labor Party was defending three seats. Four seats were newly created. Labor Senators James Arnold, Bill Ashley and William Large were not up for re-election.

Queensland
Seven seats were up for election. The Labor Party was defending three seats. Four seats were newly created. Liberal Senators Neil O'Sullivan and Annabelle Rankin and Country Party Senator Walter Cooper were not up for re-election.

South Australia
Seven seats were up for election. The Labor Party was defending three seats. Four seats were newly created. Labor Senators Fred Beerworth, Jack Critchley and Frederick Ward were not up for re-election.

Tasmania
Seven seats were up for election. The Labor Party was defending three seats. Four seats were newly created. Labor Senators Bill Morrow, Reg Murray and Justin O'Byrne were not up for re-election.

Victoria
Seven seats were up for election. The Labor Party was defending three seats. Four seats were newly created. Labor Senators Bert Hendrickson, Fred Katz and Charles Sandford were not up for re-election.

Western Australia
Seven seats were up for election. The Labor Party was defending three seats. Four seats were newly created. Labor Senators Joe Cooke, John Harris and Dorothy Tangney were not up for re-election.

Summary by party 

Beside each party is the candidates put forward by that party in the House of Representatives for each state, as well as an indication of whether the party contested Senate elections in each state.

See also
 1949 Australian federal election
 Members of the Australian House of Representatives, 1946–1949
 Members of the Australian House of Representatives, 1949–1951
 Members of the Australian Senate, 1947–1950
 Members of the Australian Senate, 1950–1951
 List of political parties in Australia

References
Adam Carr's Election Archive - House of Representatives 1949
Adam Carr's Election Archive - Senate 1949

1949 in Australia
Candidates for Australian federal elections